Grand City Properties S.A. is a residential real estate company, headquartered in Luxembourg. It invests in value-add residential opportunities in the largest cities and metropolitan areas of Germany and London. With 63.000 apartments, Grand City Properties is one of the largest residential real estate companies in Europe.

Company 
The company has annual net rent of €560 million and is distributing annual dividends of around €138 million. As of December 2019, the company’s asset value is €11 billion and equity €5 billion. The net profit in 2019 was €493 million and €340 million in 1-9/2020.

The largest single shareholder with 40% is Aroundtown SA, which is 10% owned by Yakir Gabay.

The company's portfolio is focused on properties in the metropolitan areas in the state of North Rhine-Westphalia and the cities of Berlin, Dresden, Leipzig, Hamburg and London.

Sustainability 
The European Public Real Estate Association EPRA has awarded Grand City Properties S.A. the Gold Award for sustainability. In addition, the company was awarded the first place in the category "outstanding contribution to society", in which the outstanding tenant service was acknowledged.

2017 for the first time, the company has published a sustainability report and in 2018 an EPRA report.

History 
Grand City Properties S.A. business activity was founded by Yakir Gabay in 2004. The first residential acquisitions started in the center of Berlin.

The company’s stock was listed on the Frankfurt Stock Exchange in mid 2012 at a price per share of €2.7 and market cap of €150 million. As of December 2020, the Company is listed on the Frankfurt Prime Standard and is included in the MDAX index, at a share price of €20 and market cap of €3.6 billion. The Company’s IPO is considered the most successful in the Frankfurt Stock Exchange in the last decade, with a 8 fold increase in share price within 8 years.

References

External links
Grand City Properties aims to join major Frankfurt stock index next year
Lured by Pre-Brexit Bargain, German Buyer Goes on London Real Estate Spree
GYC Stock Forecast, Price & News (Grand City Properties)
גרנד סיטי פרופרטיז הנפיקה מניות ואג"ח תמורת 300 מ' א'
הישראלי הכי מצליח בברלין, יקיר גבאי, כבר שווה 650 מיליון דולר
גרנד סיטי פרופרטיז: גידול של 59% ברווח הנקי במחצית הראשונה

Real estate companies of Luxembourg
Companies listed on the Frankfurt Stock Exchange
2012 initial public offerings
Companies in the MDAX